The 1976 US Indoor Championships was a women's singles tennis tournament played on indoor carpet courts at the Omni in Atlanta, Georgia in the United States. The event was part of the 1976 Colgate Series. It was the 68th edition of the tournament and was held from September 13 through September 19, 1976. Second-seeded Virginia Wade won the singles title and earned $14,000 first-prize money.

Winners

Singles
 Virginia Wade defeated  Betty Stöve 5–7, 7–5, 7–5

Doubles
 Rosie Casals /  Françoise Dürr defeated  Betty Stöve /  Virginia Wade 6–0, 6–4

Prize money

References

US Indoor Championships
US Indoor Championships
1976 in Georgia (U.S. state)
Sports competitions in Atlanta
Carpet court tennis tournaments